Kounahiri Department is a department of Béré Region in Woroba District, Ivory Coast. In 2021, its population was 101,111 and its seat is the settlement of Kounahiri. The sub-prefectures of the department are Kongasso and Kounahiri.

History
Kounahiri Department was created in 2005 as a second-level subdivision via a split-off from Mankono Department. At its creation, it was part of Worodougou Region.

In 2011, districts were introduced as new first-level subdivisions of Ivory Coast. At the same time, regions were reorganised and became second-level subdivisions and all departments were converted into third-level subdivisions. At this time, Kounahiri Department became part of Béré Region in Woroba District.

Notes

Departments of Béré Region
2005 establishments in Ivory Coast
States and territories established in 2005